Jay is one of the northernmost towns in Orleans County, Vermont, United States, located on the Canada–US border. The population was 551 at the 2020 census. Jay is named for John Jay, one of the Founding Fathers of the United States. The US Census Bureau estimated that the town's population had increased by 13.1% between 2000–2005, the seventh largest increase in the state.  Jay is also home to the Jay Challenge, a three-part stage-race, typically held in July.

Geography

Despite their containing the name "Jay", other peaks with this name lie mostly in adjacent Westfield, including Jay Peak itself and Jay Peak Resort.

The local Jay Branch Brook flows into the Missisquoi River.

Climate

History
One November 10, 1943, a Royal Canadian Air Force training plane crashed into the west side of the mountain near the top during a blinding snowfall killing one crew member.

Government
 Selectmen
 Michael Brady (2009)
 Mark Burroughs-Biron (2010)
 Listers 
 Arlene Bosco
 Ron Kapeluck
 Fred Cushing
 Tax Collector – Cindy Vincent
 Auditor – Edna Cushing
 Town Agent and Grand Juror – Roger Morin
 School Board
 Sally Rivard (2010)
 Peter Fina (2010)

Demographics

As of the census of 2010, there were 595 people, 276 households, and 215 families residing in the town. The population density was 15.4 people per square mile (5.9/km2). There were 685 housing units at an average density of 20.2 per square mile (7.8/km2). The racial makeup of the town was 96.9% White, 0.8% Native American, 0.6% Asian, and 1.7% from two or more races. Hispanic or Latino of any race were 0.6% of the population.

There were 276 households, out of which 43.0% had children under the age of 18 living with them, 63.7% were married couples living together, 9.9% had a female householder living alone, and 26.3% were non-families. 25.6% of all households were made up of individuals. The average household size was 2.34 and the average family size was 2.80.

In the town, the population was spread out, with 22.5% under the age of 18, 3.8% from 20 to 24, 28.9% from 25 to 44, 32.3% from 45 to 64, and 12.5% who were 65 years of age or older. The median age was 41.3 years. For every 100 females, there were 104.8 males. For every 100 females, there were 109 males.

The median income for a household in the town was $43,958, and the median income for a family was $48,594. The per capita income for the town was $20,058. About 7.4% of families and 12.2% of the population were below the poverty line, including 14.0% of those under age 18 and 10.4% of those age 65 or over.

The Jay Challenge
The Jay Challenge is a combination adventure race and triathlon that occurs yearly in and around Jay. It claims to be "the largest offroad stage race in North America", with 700-1000 racers each year. There is no cash prize and no sponsor. The course record was 19 hours and 20 minutes.

In 2007, the Jay Challenge was reduced to the running portion, and temporarily re-titled "The Ultimate XC Challenge." There were participants from 34 US states and 3 countries.

In 2008, the Ultimate XC Series expanded to three ultra-running races which included Quebec in June, Jay, Vermont in July, and Moab, Utah in November.

The last running of the Jay Challenge was in 2008.

The Vermont edition of this race series is a  "marathon" and an  "half-marathon." The course is almost completely on private property and almost 100% trails. The trails are rugged and muddy and include a variety of brook running, river crossings, steep hills, technical descents, bushwacking, and a sand pit. The race is limited to 400 for the full race and 200 for the half. Most runners who complete the full race take 2-3 times as long as their best times for a road marathon.

References

External links
Town website
Official site for the Jay Challenge
Boston Globe article

 
Towns in Vermont
Vermont
Towns in Orleans County, Vermont